Aduvalli may refer to:

 Aduvalli (Belur), a village in Karnataka, India
 Aduvalli (Hassan), a village in Karnataka, India
 Aduvalli (Narasimharajapura), a village in Karnataka, India